The 1st Texas Cavalry Regiment was a unit of mounted volunteers from Texas that fought in the Confederate States Army during the American Civil War. It was first organized as a 10-company regiment by Colonel Henry Eustace McCulloch in April 1861 and named the 1st Texas Mounted Rifles. In early May 1861, the regiment secured the surrender of the small Federal garrison of San Antonio. Except from a skirmish with Native Americans in November 1861, the regiment took part in no more actions. In April 1862, the unit was reduced to five companies and renamed the 8th Texas Cavalry Battalion. On 2 May 1862, William Overall Yager's 3rd Texas Cavalry Battalion was consolidated with the 8th Cavalry Battalion to form a new 1st Texas Cavalry Regiment under Colonel Augustus Buchel, a German soldier of fortune who emigrated to Texas in 1845. The regiment served on the Texas Gulf Coast in 1863 but later transferred to Louisiana. In 1864, it fought at Mansfield, Pleasant Hill, and Yellow Bayou in the Red River Campaign. After Buchel was killed at Pleasant Hill, Yager led the regiment for the rest of the war. The unit was included in the 2 June 1865 surrender.

See also
List of Texas Civil War Confederate units
Texas in the American Civil War

Notes

References

 

Units and formations of the Confederate States Army from Texas
1861 establishments in Texas
1865 disestablishments in Texas
Military units and formations disestablished in 1865
Military units and formations established in 1861